Germán García Durán is a Colombian civil and environmental engineer, graduated from the University of Los Andes in Bogota, Colombia, and the University of Notre Dame in South Bend, Indiana, USA.

Biography 
After being a consultant in Colombia and the United States and a university professor in Colombia, he twice served as Ambassador of Colombia to Kenya. During his diplomatic mission, García, who is an environmental engineer and had been General Manager of the National Institute of Renewable Natural Resources and Environment prior to his appointment, pursued global environmental policies as Permanent Representative to the United Nations Office at Nairobi which includes the United Nations Environment Programme, and UN-HABITAT. He was Chairman of the Group of 77 on several occasions, Vice President of the Vienna Convention for the Protection of the Ozone Layer, and is currently Executive President of Río Urbano, a Waterkeeper Alliance member NGO that looks to protect riverbeds in urban areas.

References

Living people
People from Norte de Santander Department
Colombian environmental engineers
Colombian environmentalists
University of Los Andes (Colombia) alumni
University of Notre Dame alumni
Ambassadors of Colombia to Kenya
Year of birth missing (living people)